Sabieite is a mineral with the chemical formula (NH4)Fe3+(SO4)2. Its type locality is Lone Creek Falls cave, Sabie, Pilgrim's Rest District Ehlanzeni, Mpumalanga Province, South Africa. Its crystals are trigonal to trapezohedral. It is white and leaves a white streak. It is transparent and has an earthy luster. Sabieite is rated 2 on the Mohs Scale.

References 
Webmineral.com - Sabieite
Mindat.org - Sabieite
Handbook of Mineralogy - Sabieite

Iron(III) minerals
Sulfate minerals
Trigonal minerals
Minerals in space group 150